The 2019 Thüringen Rundfahrt der Frauen (also known as the Internationalen LOTTO Thüringen Ladies Tour for sponsorship reasons) was the 31st edition of the Thüringen Rundfahrt der Frauen, a women's cycling stage race in Germany. It was rated by the UCI as a category 2.1 race and was held between 28 of May and 2 June 2019.

Schedule

Classification leadership table

See also

 Thüringen Rundfahrt der Frauen
 2019 in women's road cycling

References

External links

2019 in women's road cycling
2019
2019 in German sport